Pembroke Jones Herring (April 15, 1930 – May 19, 2020) was an American film editor who has three Oscar nominations for the category of Best Film Editing. He often worked with Sidney Poitier on the films that Poitier directed, editing nearly all of them. Herring's son, Craig Herring, is also a film editor.

Oscar nominations

1970 Academy Awards-Nominated for Tora! Tora! Tora!, along with Inoue Chikaya and James E. Newcom. Lost to Patton.
1976 Academy Awards-Nominated for Bound for Glory, along with Robert C. Jones. Lost to Rocky.
1985 Academy Awards-Nominated for Out of Africa, along with Sheldon Kahn, Fredric Steinkamp and William Steinkamp. Lost to Witness.

Filmography

Multiplicity (1996) (as Pem Herring)
Stuart Saves His Family (1995) (as Pembroke Herring)
Clifford (1994) (as Pembroke Herring) 
The Scout (1994)
Blood In, Blood Out (1993) (additional film editor) 
Groundhog Day (1993)
Sister Act 2: Back in the Habit (1993) (as Pem Herring)
Ghost Dad (1990) (as Pembroke Herring)   
Great Balls of Fire! (1989) (as Pembroke Herring) 
Last Rites (1988)
Who's That Girl (1987) (as Pembroke Herring) 
Legal Eagles (1986) (as Pem Herring) 
National Lampoon's European Vacation (1985)
Out of Africa (1985) (as Pembroke Herring)
Johnny Dangerously (1984)
National Lampoon's Vacation (1983) (as Pem Herring) 
The Best Little Whorehouse in Texas (1982)
Zorro, The Gay Blade (1981) (supervising editor) 
Little Darlings (1980)
9 to 5 (1980)
The Runner Stumbles (1979)
Foul Play (1978)
A Piece of the Action (1977)
SST: Death Flight (1977) (as Pembroke Herring)  
Bound for Glory (1976)
Let's Do It Again (1975)
Uptown Saturday Night (1974)
A Warm December (1973)
Buck and the Preacher (1972)
Maybe I'll Come Home in the Spring (1971)
Tora! Tora! Tora! (1970)

TV credits
Barnaby Jones
Daniel Boone

References

External links
 

1930 births
2020 deaths
American film editors